Jungle Street is a 1961 black and white British crime drama directed by Charles Saunders and starring David McCallum, Kenneth Cope, and Jill Ireland, about a young man who attempts to escape his working-class background and win the girl he loves through crime. The film was the first of three films produced by the Theatrecraft production company in the early 1960s. It was later released in the United States under the title Jungle Street Girls.

Plot
The credits roll as a number 12 double decker bus headed for Harlesden drives through London. It stops in Shepherd's Bush. An elderly man gets off and is mugged by a young man in an alley.

We then go to the Adam and Eve Club, where girls perform erotic dances on stage. In the club lobby car mechanic (and petty criminal) Terry Collins (David McCallum) speaks with Joe Lucas (Brian Weske) at the outer bar and asks to see the owner -  gangster Jacko Fielding (John Chandos). Jacko is with his main girl, Sue. Julie, the hatcheck girl brings in the evening's takings and Terry eyes it greedily.

In the club Terry watches Sue strip and lights a cigarette at the bar. The audience is mainly old men. Terry is obsessed with the star stripper Sue (Jill Ireland), but is unable to pursue her openly because the wealthy and powerful Jacko is interested in her.

In Terry's working class home he bickers with his parents over breakfast. Terry belittles his father and his beer-drinking. The morning paper (Daily Express) informs Terry that he killed his victim - the man at the start of the film. His mother sees the headline and hopes they hang the murderer.

At the police station two plain clothes police interview Joe Lucas who says he spent the night with Dimples - one of the dancers at the club. The police seem to think the murder is connected to the club and so ask about all the men there.

Johnny Calvert appears at Terry's mum's house looking for Terry. He is not home but she invites him in and they chat. The police spot Johnny and check him out - he has been in prison for robbery.

Joe confronts Terry in the club and hints that he knows he did it. Terry punches him confirming his idea. The girls appear and Terry remains in a mood. The bouncer knocks him out with a punch and Sue looks after him backstage. He steals a kiss and gets thrown out.

At the Star Garage where Terry works the police wait inside and Johnny Calvert sits opposite in a cafe. He is interviewed by Sgt Philip. He is asked about an Austin A40. Then he asks if he knows Johnny Calvert - he says no. The newspaper says the police have the wallet and they are going to fingerprint the whole district. Terry tracks down Johnny in a rented room ove a tailor's shop. He apologises for spending Johnny's share of the robbery but suggests they rob the Adam and Eve Club. He tells Johnny that Sue (Johnny's old girlfriend) is working there as a stripper. She was forced to strip for money when johnny went to prison.

They go to the club together. Jacko invites Terry into the back office. Johnny goes backstage and finds Sue in her dressing room. He slaps her. She claims to have been true to him since he went and they kiss.

Jacko is interviewing a new girl why Terry relaxes with a drink and eyes the safe. Terry and Johnny reunite at the club bar. Johnny leaves and Joe sits down. Joe threatens to blackmail him. He is surprised after asking for £10 that Terry offers him £50.

Sue visits Johnny in his room and asks him to "take her away" as she lies on the bed.

The police start door-to-door fingerprinting and are told to make a note of the names of those who refuse.

At a very sunny 4 o'clock the elderly caretaker of the club comes out to feed the cats and Terry coshes him and goes to the office with Johnny. They blow the safe. Terry double-crosses Johnny by knocking him out and absconding with the money, just as the club's caretaker manages to trigger an alarm, alerting the police. Johnny is caught and tells the police Terry is his accomplice.

Terry rushes to Johnny's flat, where Sue is waiting, and tries to get her to run away with him. When she resists, demanding to know what happened to Johnny, Terry tries to abduct her at gunpoint. The police arrive, tipped off by Johnny and Joe, and Terry takes Sue and Mr. I. J. Rose, the elderly tailor who occupies the flat next door, as hostages in a standoff. Mr. Rose tries to get Terry to hand over his gun. The police bursting through the door causes Terry to accidentally fatally shoot Mr. Rose and he is dragged away screaming by police as Mr. Rose dies in Sue's arms.

Cast

 David McCallum as Terry Collins
 Kenneth Cope as Johnny Calvert
 Jill Ireland as Sue
 Brian Weske as Joe Lucas
 Vanda Hudson as Lucy Bell
 Edna Doré as Mrs. Collins
 Thomas Gallagher as Mr. Collins
 Howard Pays as Sergeant Pelling
 Joy Webster as Rene
 Martin Sterndale as Inspector Bowen
 John Chandos as Jacko Fielding
 Meier Tzelniker as Mr. Rose the tailor
 Larry Burns as Barman
 Fred Griffiths as Dealer (Dealo) the bouncer
 Julie Shearing as Julie the Cashier
 Faye Craig as Native Dancer
 Anne Scott as Margo
 Gillian Watt as Dancing Girl
 Alfred Farrell as Mr. Burns
 Jacqueline Jones as Dolly
 William Wilde as Sid Porter
 Howard Douglas as Old Bill
 Richard McNeff as Policeman
 Marian Collins as Announcer
 Shirley Anne Field as Jaqui

Production
Jungle Street was one of the last films directed by Charles Saunders. According to producer Guido Coen, the film's star, David McCallum, had "substantial input" into the direction of the film. Critic Michael J. Weldon has called it the last of McCallum's "juvenile delinquent" film roles. McCallum and Ireland were married at the time the film was made.

Despite its setting in a strip club, the film received an "A" rating from the British Board of Film Classification after removing some material, including shortening two striptease scenes and deleting a back view of Jill Ireland baring her breasts to the club audience.

The film, retitled Jungle Street Girls, was later released and promoted as an adults-only film in the United States by Ajay Films.

DVD release

Jungle Street was released on DVD by Odeon Entertainment in 2008, in a set with the 1963 British crime drama A Matter of Choice.

References

External links

1961 crime drama films
1961 films
British crime drama films
Films set in London
Films shot in London
Films directed by Charles Saunders
Films shot at Twickenham Film Studios
1960s English-language films
1960s British films